Donna VanLiere is an American author of fiction, primarily novels about Christmas.

Her first book, The Christmas Shoes, was a New York Times bestseller, as was The Christmas Blessing, The Christmas Hope, The Christmas Secret and The Christmas Note, all of which have been adapted into television movies.

Bibliography
 The Christmas Shoes, St. Martin's Press, 2001
 The Christmas Blessing, St. Martin's Press, 2003
 The Christmas Hope, St. Martin's Press, 2005
 The Christmas Promise, St. Martin's Press, 2007
 The Angels of Morgan Hill, St. Martin's Press, 2008
 The Christmas Secret, St. Martin's Press, 2009
 Finding Grace, St. Martin's Press, 2009
 The Christmas Journey, St. Martin's Press, 2010
 The Christmas Note, St. Martin's Press, 2011
 The Good Dream, St. Martin's Press, 2012
 The Christmas Light, St. Martin's Press, 2014
The Christmas Town, St. Martin's Press, 2016
The Christmas Star, St Martin's Press, 2018
The Christmas Table, St Martin's Press, 2020
The Time of Jacob's Trouble, Harvest House Publishers, 2020
The Day of Ezekiel's Hope, Harvest House Publishers, 2021
Daniel's Final Week, Harvest House Publishers, 2022

References

External links
 Donna VanLiere's website

Year of birth missing (living people)
Living people
21st-century American novelists
American women novelists
21st-century American women writers